The 1974 Texas–Arlington Mavericks football team was an American football team that represented the University of Texas at Arlington in the Southland Conference during the 1974 NCAA Division II football season. In their first year under head coach Harold Elliott, the team compiled a 1–10 record.

Schedule

References

Texas–Arlington
Texas–Arlington Mavericks football seasons
Texas–Arlington Mavericks football